Kim Jong-o (born 7 December 1966) is a South Korean wrestler. He competed in the men's freestyle 52 kg at the 1988 Summer Olympics.

References

External links
 

1966 births
Living people
South Korean male sport wrestlers
Olympic wrestlers of South Korea
Wrestlers at the 1988 Summer Olympics
Place of birth missing (living people)
Wrestlers at the 1994 Asian Games
Asian Games competitors for South Korea
20th-century South Korean people